Cookie Crew were a rap music duo formed in Clapham, South London in 1983.

Career
Their career took off after winning a national rap championship and recording two sessions for the John Peel BBC Radio 1 show. They gained a recording contract from the UK dance record label Rhythm King and were put in the studio with the production trio Beatmasters, who put them in a house music direction.

In July 1987, the resultant single "Rok da House" was popular in the nightclubs. Their follow-up single "Females" also was a minor hit in October 1987. The continuing popularity of "Rok da House" in nightclubs eventually renewed interest in the track and garnered television appearances on the No Limits programme. The record was remixed at the end of December 1987 and crossed over into the mainstream. The song became a Top 5 hit in the UK Singles Chart at the beginning of February 1988, and was used for an advertising campaign. The "embryonic hip-house track" was "one of the earliest examples of hip house".

The duo moved on to another record label, FFRR and different producers, resulting in a string of hit singles in 1989, with "Born This Way (Let's Dance)", "Got to Keep On" with Edwin Starr and "Come and Get Some"; plus the album Born This Way! which reached number 24 in the UK Albums Chart. "Got to Keep On" also reached #33 in the U.S. Dance chart.

By 1992, there were differences of opinion between the duo and label, who wanted to pursue more of an orthodox hip hop/rap style, and FFRR's owner London Records, who wanted to steer the duo towards more of a pop oriented style of rap. This resulted in the duo parting company with FFRR and retiring from the hip hop/rap scene. Despite this, Pryce and Banfield have remained involved with other projects within the music industry.

The two continued to perform and travel the world. Banfield is the sister of The Pasadenas' singer Andrew Banfield, and Pryce was formerly a chef for the Ministry of Defence.

Group members
MC Remedee (born Debbie Pryce, 16 August 1967)
Susie Q (born Susan Banfield, 10 March 1967)

Discography

Albums
Born This Way – 1989 – UK No. 24; U.S. R&B #93
Fade to Black – 1991

Singles

References

External links
Heroes Of UK Hip Hop Cookie Crew Page
Detailed biography and discography
BBC / John Peel based biography

English hip hop groups
English electronic music duos
English house music duos
Women hip hop groups
Hip house music groups
Musical groups from the London Borough of Lambeth
Musical groups established in 1983
Musical groups disestablished in 1992
1983 establishments in England
1992 disestablishments in England
English girl groups
Female musical duos
Hip hop duos
British hip hop girl groups
Black British musical groups
Black_British_women_rappers
FFRR Records artists
Rhythm King artists